Maria Noel Riccetto (born 27 March 1980) is an Uruguayan ballet dancer and former soloist with American Ballet Theatre (ABT).

Biography
Riccetto was born in Montevideo, Uruguay, and began studying ballet at the Uruguay National Ballet School in 1990. She was hired as a professional dancer in 1995 by the Uruguayan National Ballet, which depends on the Official Service of Broadcasting, Television and Entertainment (SODRE), dancing pieces by Rodolfo Lastra, Ivan Tenorio, Jaime Pintos, and others. In 1998, Riccetto was named "Revelation of the Year" by Uruguayan dance critic Washington Roldan, and received the Elena Smirnova Prize from Enrique Honorio Destaville, an Argentine ballet reviewer. Later that year she attended the North Carolina School of the Arts on a full scholarship. There she performed in Grand Pas Romantique (choreographed and staged by Fernando Bujones) and Intermezzo (choreographed by Eliot Feld).

She also danced the roles of the Sugar Plum Fairy and the Snow Queen in The Nutcracker. In 1999, when the production was performed at the Hungarian National Academy, Ms. Riccetto was invited to Budapest to reprise her role as the Sugar Plum Fairy, dancing with Gabor Szigeti, a soloist with the Hungarian National Ballet. Riccetto was as a guest artist at the 25th Anniversary Gala for the Uruguay National Ballet School and was invited by that country's First Lady to dance in Montevideo and Punta Del Este.  In August 1999, Riccetto joined American Ballet Theatre's corps de ballet and three years later she was promoted to soloist.

Riccetto was the "dance double" for Mila Kunis in the 2010 film Black Swan, a psychological thriller about ballet dancers in New York City.

After 13 years of dancing in the American Ballet Theatre, in 2012 Riccetto came back to Uruguay to dance in the Uruguayan National Ballet, directed by Argentinian former dancer Julio Bocca.

In 2017, Riccetto was awarded a Prix Benois de la Danse for her performance of Tatiana in Onegin.

Television
In September 2019, it was confirmed that she was chosen as a judge in Got Talent Uruguay, which premiered on 22 June 2020, on Channel 10. The other judges are Orlando Petinatti, Claudia Fernández and Agustín Casanova.

Awards
2017 : Prix Benois de la Danse

Selected repertoire
American Ballet Theatre.

 the Girl in Afternoon of a Faun
 Calliope in Apollo
 first and third Shades in La Bayadère
 Petal in Cinderella
 Prayer in Coppélia
 Gulnare and an Odalisque in Le Corsaire
 Mercedes, Amour and a flower girl in Don Quixote
 Giselle, the peasant pas de deux and Zulma in Giselle
 the Two of Diamonds in Jeu de cartes
 Valencienne in The Merry Widow

 Clara in The Nutcracker
 Olga in Onegin
 Natalia in On the Dnieper
 the Street Dancer in Petrouchka
 Henrietta in Raymonda
 the Lilac Fairy, Fairy of Sincerity and Princess Florine in The Sleeping Beauty
 the Young Girl in Le Spectre de la Rose
 the pas de trois and the Italian Princess in Swan Lake
 the Mazurka and Prelude in Les Sylphides
 the Greedy One in Three Virgins and a Devil

References

External links 
 

1980 births
People from Montevideo
American Ballet Theatre soloists
Uruguayan ballerinas
Living people
Prix Benois de la Danse winners
Uruguayan ballet dancers
Uruguayan National Ballet dancers
Uruguayan people of Italian descent